The following lists events that happened during 1938 in Australia.

Incumbents

Monarch – George VI
Governor-General – Alexander Hore-Ruthven, 1st Baron Gowrie
Prime Minister – Joseph Lyons
Chief Justice – Sir John Latham

State Premiers
Premier of New South Wales – Bertram Stevens
Premier of Queensland – William Forgan Smith
Premier of South Australia – Richard L. Butler (until 5 November), then Thomas Playford IV
Premier of Tasmania – Albert Ogilvie
Premier of Victoria – Albert Dunstan
Premier of Western Australia – John Willcock

State Governors
Governor of New South Wales – John Loder, 2nd Baron Wakehurst
Governor of Queensland – Sir Leslie Orme Wilson
Governor of South Australia – Sir Winston Dugan
Governor of Tasmania – Sir Ernest Clark
Governor of Victoria – William Vanneck, 5th Baron Huntingfield
Governor of Western Australia – none appointed

Events

 26 January – Australia officially celebrates its sesquicentennial, the 150th anniversary of European settlement. Unofficially, it is a Day of Mourning for Indigenous Australians.
 6 February – Three hundred beachgoers are dragged out to sea when three freak waves strike Bondi Beach in Sydney in an event known as "Black Sunday". A team of eighty surf lifesavers manage to rescue all but five people.
 13 February – Nineteen people die when Sydney ferry the Rodney, carrying 150 passengers, capsizes in Sydney Harbour while farewelling US Navy cruiser .
 1 April – New monthly newspaper Abo Call begins publication in Sydney, focusing on issues of Aboriginal rights and edited by activist Jack Patten.
 11 May – Two jockeys are killed and two are injured in a horse racing accident at Morphettville Racecourse in Adelaide, South Australia.
 25 October – Eighteen people die in Australia's worst air disaster when the Douglas DC-2 Kyeema crashes in the Dandenong Ranges in thick fog.
 15 November – Waterside workers at Port Kembla, New South Wales refuse to load a consignment of scrap iron destined for Japan, arguing that it would be used for munitions. Attorney-General Robert Menzies attempts to force the loading of the cargo, earning himself the nickname "Pig Iron Bob".
 21 December – A direct radio-telephone link is established between Canberra and Washington D.C.
 28 December – The Sydney Mail ceases publication.

Arts and literature

 31 March – Xavier Herbert wins the Commonwealth 150th anniversary literary award for his novel Capricornia.
 30 December – The Passing of the Aborigines by Daisy Bates is published.

Sport
 5 to 12 February – The 1938 British Empire Games are held in Sydney. Australia leads the medal tally at the games, winning 25 gold medals, 19 silver and 22 bronze.
 20 August – At Royal Park, Melbourne, the Australia national netball team defeated New Zealand 40–11. This was the first netball Test between Australia and New Zealand. 
 2 September – Canterbury-Bankstown defeat Eastern Suburbs 19 to 6 in the grand final, becoming premiers of the 1938 NSWRFL season. St. George finish in last place, claiming the wooden spoon.
 1 November – Catalogue wins the Melbourne Cup.

Births
3 January –  Alan Ramsey, journalist (died 2020)
12 January
 Lewis Fiander, actor (died 2016)
 Noel McNamara, crime victims supporter
13 January – Daevid Allen, musician (Soft Machine) (died 2015)
17 January – David Theile, backstroke swimmer
21 January – Steve Dunleavy, journalist (died 2019)
21 February – John Harvey, racing driver (died 2020)
25 February – Herb Elliott, athlete
28 February – Dennis Olsen, pianist, actor and director
1 March – Henry Reynolds, historian
5 March – Mike Walsh, television presenter
19 March – John Winneke, judge (died 2019)
25 March – Anthony Carwardine, naval officer
20 April – Betty Cuthbert, athlete (died 2017)
29 April – Jim Lenehan, rugby union player (died 2022)
5 June – Roy Higgins, jockey (died 2014)
18 June – Kevin Murray, Australian rules footballer (Fitzroy)
19 June – Ian Smith, actor and screenwriter
20 June – Joan Kirner, Premier of Victoria (1990–1992) (died 2015)
23 June – John Gerovich, Australian rules footballer
25 June – Mick Allen, rower (died 2021)
27 June – Bob Baxt, lawyer (died 2018)
28 June – Sergio Silvagni, Australian rules footballer (died 2021)
8 July – Paul Cronin, television and film actor (died 2019)
13 July – Ian Macphee, politician, Minister for Immigration
15 July – Carmen Callil, publisher (died 2022)
16 July – Colin Rice, Australian rules footballer
23 July – Bert Newton, entertainer (died 2021)
28 July – Robert Hughes, art critic (died 2012)
9 August – Rod Laver, tennis player
22 August – Roger Gyles, lawyer and judge
30 August – Murray Gleeson, High Court judge
2 September – Ernie Sigley, entertainer (died 2021)
8 October – Fred Stolle, tennis player
17 October – Les Murray, poet (died 2019)
30 October – Morris Lurie, writer (died 2014)
8 November – Bob Skilton, Australian rules footballer (South Melbourne)
26 November – Rodney Jory, physicist
4 December – Yvonne Minton, operatic soprano
11 December – Reg Livermore, actor, singer and television presenter
21 December – Frank Moorhouse, writer (died 2022)

Deaths
6 January – John Gavin (born 1875), film director
15 January – Paul Raphael Montford (born 1868), sculptor
21 January – Will Dyson (born 1880), cartoonist
31 January – John Barnes (born 1868), politician
16 February – Thomas Molloy (born 1852), WA politician
21 April – Sir Talbot Hobbs (born 1864), architect
11 May – Lawrence Wells (born 1860), explorer
17 May – Nora Clench (born 1867), Canadian violinist
17 June – Ranji Hordern (born 1883), cricketer
19 June – Jack Hides (born 1906), explorer
22 June – C. J. Dennis (born 1876), poet
29 June – Sir Colin Mackenzie (born 1877), anatomist and museum administrator
30 August – Evelyn Marsden (born 1883), survivor of the Titanic
11 September – Sir Philip Whistler Street (born 1863), NSW Supreme Court judge
12 October – Hugh Massie (born 1854), cricketer
25 October – Charles Hawker (born 1884), politician
29 November – John Sandes (born 1863), journalist and author

See also
 List of Australian films of the 1930s

References

 
Australia
Years of the 20th century in Australia